Susan Glick is an American lawyer and politician from the state of Indiana. A Republican, she had been a member of the Indiana Senate since 2010. She was LaGrange County Prosecuting Attorney from 1983 to 1990.

Education
Glick is a graduate of Indiana University Bloomington.

Legal career
Glick served as LaGrange County Prosecuting Attorney from 1983 to 1990. Before that she worked for Governor Otis Bowen. She practiced law for 30 years prior to her tenure as a state senator.

Senate
Glick has represented the 13th district in the state senate since 2010. She was sworn into the state senate on December 16, 2010, Randall Shepard presided over the ceremony. She was selected as a replacement for Senator Marlin Stutzman, who was elected to Congress. The district includes parts of Kosciusko, LaGrange, Noble, Steuben and DeKalb counties.

In 2022, Glick authored a bill to impose a near-total ban on abortion in Indiana. The bill passed on the Republican-controlled Senate on a 26-20 vote in July 2022, one month after the U.S. Supreme Court overturned Roe v. Wade and decided that there was no federal constitutional right to abortion.

Personal
Glick is a Methodist and serves on her local library board.

References

External links
 official Indiana State Legislature site

Republican Party Indiana state senators
Women state legislators in Indiana
Living people
21st-century American politicians
21st-century American women politicians
Year of birth missing (living people)